The 2018 British GT Championship was the 26th British GT Championship, a sports car championship promoted by the Stéphane Ratel Organisation (SRO). The season began on 31 March at Oulton Park and finished on 23 September at Donington Park, after nine rounds held over seven meetings.

Calendar
The calendar for the 2018 season was announced on 29 July 2017. All races except Belgian round at Spa, were held in the United Kingdom.

Entry list

GT3

GT4

Race results
Bold indicates overall winner for each car class (GT3 and GT4).

Championship Standings
Points are awarded as follows:

Drivers' Championships

Overall

Pro-Am Cup

Silver Cup

Blancpain Trophy

1 – Driver scored 5 points for being fastest in the Am Driver qualifying session.

Team's Championship

References

External links
 

British GT Championship seasons
GT Championship